Vyacheslav Chukanov (born 24 April 1952) is a Soviet equestrian and Olympic champion. He won a gold medal in show jumping with the Soviet team at the 1980 Summer Olympics in Moscow.

Personal life
His son Andrea Chukanov is a professional football player.

References

1952 births
Living people
Russian male equestrians
Soviet male equestrians
Olympic equestrians of the Soviet Union
Olympic gold medalists for the Soviet Union
Equestrians at the 1980 Summer Olympics
Equestrians at the 1988 Summer Olympics
Sportspeople from Moscow
Olympic medalists in equestrian
Medalists at the 1980 Summer Olympics